Austin Area Junior Senior High School is a diminutive, public high school in southern and rural Potter County, Pennsylvania. Austin Area Junior Senior High School serves grades 7–12 and is the smallest school in the state. Austin Area Junior Senior High School is located at 138 Costello Avenue, Austin. The School shares the kitchen and administrative offices with the adjoining Austin Area Elementary School, which makes up the entire Austin Area School District.  In  the 2017–2018 school year, Austin Area High School enrollment was 79 pupils in 7th through 12th grades.

Extracurriculars
Austin Area School District offers a limited variety of clubs, activities and a publicly funded sports program.

Athletics 
Austin Area participates in District IX of the PIAA. Cooperative sports for those who wish to participate in a sport not held at the school is offered by the Coudersport Area School District.

Senior High Athletics

Junior High Athletics
Boys
Basketball
Girls
Basketball
Volleyball

Organizations 
There are a few organizations at the school.
Band and Chorus
Busted
Enrichment
FCCLA
National Honor Society
Newspaper
Student Council
Yearbook
Yellow Ribbon

References

Public high schools in Pennsylvania
Public middle schools in Pennsylvania
Education in Potter County, Pennsylvania
Buildings and structures in Potter County, Pennsylvania